Limnatis may refer to:

 Limnatis (leech), a genus of leeches
 Limnatis, Limassol, a village in Cyprus
 Limnatis River, a river in Cyprus discharging into the Kouris Dam
 Limnatis, an epithet of Artemis

See also 
 Limnitis, a village in Northern Cyprus
 Limnatides, a type of Greek nymphs
 Limnaea (disambiguation)